Johannis may refer to:

 Johannis Winar (born 1970), Indonesian basketball coach and former player
 Klaus Johannis (born 1959), Romanian teacher and politician
 Olaus Johannis Gutho (died 1516), Bridgettine monk
 the Johannis or Iohannis, a Latin epic poem in honour of John Troglita, by Flavius Cresconius Corippus

See also
 St. Johannis (disambiguation)
 Johannis L. Van Alen Farm